Inactive rhomboid protein 1 (iRhom1) also known as rhomboid 5 homolog 1 or rhomboid family member 1 (RHBDF1) is a protein that in humans is encoded by the RHBDF1 gene. The alternative name iRhom1 has been proposed, in order to clarify that it is a catalytically inactive member of the rhomboid family of intramembrane serine proteases.

References

Further reading